The Saint George River is a river in Maine with a watershed of  in a unique and historic area of mountains, sea coast, lakes, tidal streams and inlets. The origin of the Saint George River is the outflow of Saint George Lake in Liberty.

Indigenous settlement
Paleo-Indians first appeared in the Saint George River area about 7,300 BCE. Little is known of Paleo-Indians history in this area.

The Wawenock or Walinakiak Indians resided on the banks of the Saint George River at European contact in 1605. The Wawenock Indians were one of four related tribes of the Abenaki, who inhabited central and southeastern Maine.  Walinakiak means "People of the bays".

Numbering about 10,000 people in 1500, the Wawenock tribe was decimated by a series of epidemics during the latter 16th century and through the 17th century, falling to about 1,000 people by the end of the American Revolution.

Two members of the Wawenock tribe were captured by Captain Weymouth in 1605, and one Wawenock was returned from England in 1607 aboard either the Gift of God or the John & Mary by the Plymouth Company.

The Wawenock along the Saint George’s lived on cultivated products including pumpkins, maize and beans, along with fish, shellfish and game. A large Wawenock shellfish midden at Damariscotta dates back 2,200 years. Captain Weymouth observed this midden in 1605.

European settlement
George Weymouth, captain of the Archangel, made the first documented European landfall at Monhegan Island on the lower estuary of the Saint George River on May 17, 1605.  On June 11, 1605, Weymouth led an overnight exploration from Monhegan Island which resulted in the identification of “a most excellent river”, which Weymouth named the Saint George.

In 1606 and 1607 the Plymouth Company sent ships into the area to colonize, but the settlers of the Popham Colony and those who settled along the Kennebec River returned to England in 1608.  127 years would pass before the first permanent European settlers came to live along the Saint George River. The trading post lasted a number of years, falling to one of the various Indian wars by 1650.

In 1735, Samuel Waldo of Boston, having acquired most of the land at the mouth of the Saint George River, encouraged 35 families to settle the area now known as St. George, thus creating the first permanent European settlement on the river. By 1760, 175 families lived along the estuary.

See also
List of rivers of Maine

References

Maine Streamflow Data from the USGS
Maine Watershed Data From Environmental Protection Agency

Bibliography 
 Gould, Albert T., The Saint George’s River, Athoensen Press, Portland, ME, 1950

Rivers of Maine
Geography of Knox County, Maine
Geography of Waldo County, Maine